Jamba Lakidi Pamba is a 2018 Telugu comedy film. It is remake of 1992 film of the same name. It stars Srinivasa Reddy and Siddhi Idnani.

Plot
The story revolves around a couple Varun (Srinivasa Reddy) and Pallavi (Siddhi Idnani) who file a divorce case. Their previous divorce lawyer (Posani Krishna Murali) dies in a car accident with incidentally being this as his 100th case. He wants to go to Heaven but is prevented as he separated 99 couples. But the god gave him a last chance by making Varun and Pallavi reconcile. He immediately interchanges their souls. How the lawyer tries to reconcile them forms the crux of the story.

Cast

 Srinivasa Reddy as Varun
 Siddhi Idnani as Pallavi
 Vennela Kishore as Lawyer 
 Himaja as Divya
 Tanikella Bharani as Varun's father
 Posani Krishna Murali as previous lawyer who died in a car accident
 Raghu Babu
 Satyam Rajesh
 Jaya Prakash Reddy as J.P 
 Appaji Ambarisha Darbha as Corporate CEO
 Shakalaka Shankar

Reception
The Times of India gave 2 out of 5 stars concluding it's a dull affair.

References

External links 
 

2018 films
2018 comedy films
Indian comedy films
Films scored by Gopi Sundar
2010s Telugu-language films
Remakes of Indian films